Random Encounter is a 1998 movie directed by Douglas Jackson and written by Matt Dorff. It stars Elizabeth Berkley as a young and rising public relations executive who meets a strange man after a cocktail party, and is framed for murder.

Reception
TV Guide said, "while such trashy cautionary tales can be hugely entertaining (take NO STRINGS ATTACHED, for example), this threadbare thriller is undermined by truly appalling performances."

References

External links

1998 films
1998 crime thriller films
Films directed by Douglas Jackson
1990s English-language films